César Almeida de Oliveira (born March 23, 1988), is a Brazilian kickboxer and mixed martial artist who competes in the Glory and WGP Kickboxing middleweight divisions. He is the current WGP Kickboxing Cruiserweight and former SUPERKOMBAT Light Heavyweight Plus Champion.

As of January 2023, he is ranked as the second best middleweight kickboxer in the world by Beyond Kick and as the third best middleweight in the world by Combat Press.

Kickboxing career

WGP Kickboxing

Early career
Almeida took part in the 2013 WGP Kickboxing Cruiserweight tournament, held at WGP Kickboxing 17 on December 21, 2013. He was booked to face Cristian Torres in the semifinals of the one-day tournament. Almeida won the fight by a second-round knockout and advanced to the finals, where he faced Alex Pereira. He won the fight by decision.

Almeida fought a trilogy bout with Alex Pereira, with the WGP Kickboxing Cruiserweight championship on the line, at WGP Kickboxing 25 on July 25, 2015. He lost the fight by unanimous decision.

César faced Moises Baute for the SUPERKOMBAT Light Heavyweight Plus championship and the WKN International Kickboxing oriental rules title at SUPERKOMBAT World Grand Prix II 2016 on May 7, 2016. He won the fight by unanimous decision. He extended his win streak to three fights with a second round stoppage of Guilherme Gimenez at WGP Kickboxing 33 on September 10, 2016.

Almeida took part in the WGP Kickboxing Heavyweight (-94.1 kg) tournament, which was held at WGP Kickboxing 34 on November 1, 2016. He was able to overcome Ricardo Soneca in the semifinals of the one-day tournament by a second-round knockout and advanced to the finals, where he suffered a decision loss to Haime Morais.

Almeida faced Marcelo Nuñez at WGP Kickboxing 36 on April 7, 2017. He won the fight by unanimous decision.

WGP Cruiserweight champion
Almeida faced Lucas Alsina for the WGP Kickboxing Cruiserweight (85 kg) championship at WGP Kickboxing 50 on October 27, 2018. He beat Alsina by a fourth round knockout, managing to stop his opponent through repeated low kicks.

After capturing his fourth piece of professional silverware, Alemida would go on to fight in two non-title bouts. Almeida was first booked to face Hao Guanghua at MAS Fight on November 10, 2018. He won the fight by stoppage. Alemida next faced Lucas Dallapico at Premier Fight League on February 23, 2019. He won the fight by a second-round technical knockout.

Almeida made his first WGP Kickboxing Cruiserweight title defense against Ivan Galaz at WGP Kickboxing 54 on May 24, 2019. He retained the title by a decision draw.

Almeida faced Sergey Veselkin in his Fair Fight debut at Fair Fight IX on July 8, 2019. He lost the fight by decision, after an extra fourth round was contested. Almeida faced Igor Bugaenko in his second appearance with the promotion at Fair Fight X on October 26, 2019. He won the fight by an extra round decision.

Glory
Almeida made his Glory debut against Donovan Wisse at Glory Collision 2 on December 21, 2019. Wisse won the fight by majority decision.

Almeida made his second WGP Kickboxing Cruiserweight title defense against Ivan Galaz at WGP Kickboxing 66 on September 3, 2022, following a three-year break from the sport of kickboxing. He won the fight by a first-round knockout.

Almeida faced the #1 ranked Glory middleweight contender Serkan Ozcaglayan at Glory: Collision 4 on October 8, 2022. He won the fight by a dominant unanimous decision, with all five judges awarding him a 29–26 scorecard.

Almeida was expected to challenge the Glory Middleweight (-85 kg) champion Donovan Wisse at Glory 83 on February 11, 2023. The bout was a rematch of their first meeting, that took place on December 21, 2019, and which Wisse won by majority decision. The fight was downgraded to a three round non-title bout however, as Almeida missed weight by one kilogram at the official weigh-ins. Almeida lost the fight by unanimous decision.

Championships and awards

WGP Kickboxing
2013 WGP Kickboxing Cruiserweight (-85 kg) Tournament Winner
2016 WGP Kickboxing Heavyweight (-94.1 kg) Tournament Runner-up
2018 WGP Kickboxing Cruiserweight (-85 kg) Championship
One successful title defense
SUPERKOMBAT
2016 SUPERKOMBAT Light Heavyweight Plus (-86 kg) Championship 
World Kickboxing Network
2016 WKN International Oriental Rules Super Light Heayvweight (-85 kg) Champion
World Association of Kickboxing Organizations
2014 WAKO Pro Brazilian Light Cruiserweight (-85 kg) K-1 Rules Championship
Brazilian Kickboxing Federation
2013 Brazil National -81 kg Kickboxing Champion

Kickboxing record

|- style="background:#fbb;"
| 2023-02-11|| Loss ||align=left| Donovan Wisse || Glory 83 || Essen, Germany || Decision (Unanimous) ||3  ||3:00

|- style="background:#cfc;"
| 2022-10-08 || Win|| align="left" | Serkan Ozcaglayan || Glory: Collision 4 || Arnhem, Netherlands || Decision (Unanimous) ||3  ||3:00 
|-  style="background:#c5d2ea;"
| 2022-09-03 || NC ||align=left| Ivan Galaz || WGP Kickboxing 66|| São Bernardo do Campo, Brazil || No Contest (Hit after the bell) || 1|| 3:00
|-
! style=background:white colspan=9 |
|-  bgcolor="#FFBBBB"
| 2019-12-21|| Loss||align=left| Donovan Wisse || Glory Collision 2 || Arnhem, Netherlands || Decision (Majority) || 3 || 3:00
|-  style="background:#CCFFCC;"
| 2019-10-26 || Win||align=left| Igor Bugaenko || Fair Fight X|| Yekaterinburg, Russia || Ext. R. Decision (Unanimous)  || 4||3:00
|-  style="background:#FFBBBB;"
| 2019-07-08 || Loss||align=left| Sergey Veselkin || Fair Fight IX|| Yekaterinburg, Russia || Ext. R. Decision (Unanimous)   || 4||3:00
|-
|-  style="background:#c5d2ea;"
| 2019-05-24 || Draw ||align=left| Ivan Galaz || WGP Kickboxing 54 || Santiago, Chile || Decision || 5|| 3:00
|-
! style=background:white colspan=9 |
|-  style="background:#CCFFCC;"
| 2019-02-23 || Win||align=left| Lucas Dallapico || Premier Fight League|| Lauro de Freitas, Brazil || TKO|| 2||
|-  style="background:#CCFFCC;"
| 2018-11-10 || Win||align=left| Hao Guanghua || MAS Fight||  Macau || KO || ||
|-  style="background:#CCFFCC;"
| 2018-10-27 || Win||align=left| Lucas Alsina || WGP Kickboxing 50|| São Paulo, Brazil || KO (Low Kicks)|| 4|| 
|-
! style=background:white colspan=9 |
|-  style="background:#CCFFCC;"
| 2018-05-18 || Win||align=left| Nattan Novak|| WGP Kickboxing 46|| São Paulo, Brazil || KO (Left Hook to the Body)|| 2|| 2:56
|-  style="background:#CCFFCC;"
| 2017-04-07 || Win||align=left| Marcelo Nuñez|| WGP Kickboxing 36|| São Paulo, Brazil || Decision (Unanimous) || 3|| 3:00
|-  style="background:#FFBBBB;"
| 2016-11-01 || Loss||align=left| Haime Morais || WGP Kickboxing 34, Final|| São Paulo, Brazil || Decision|| 3|| 3:00
|-
! style=background:white colspan=9 |
|-  style="background:#CCFFCC;"
| 2016-11-01 || Win||align=left| Ricardo Soneca || WGP Kickboxing 34, Semi Final|| São Paulo, Brazil || KO (High Kick & Punches)|| 2|| 2:40
|-  style="background:#CCFFCC;"
| 2016-09-10 || Win||align=left| Guilherme Gimenez || WGP Kickboxing 33|| São Paulo, Brazil || KO (Low Kick)|| 2|| 0:25
|-  style="background:#CCFFCC;"
| 2016-05-07 || Win||align=left| Moises Baute || SUPERKOMBAT World Grand Prix II 2016|| Bucharest, Romania || Decision (Unanimous) || 3 ||3:00
|-
! style=background:white colspan=9 |
|-  style="background:#CCFFCC;"
| 2015-12-19 || Win||align=left| Rodolfo Cavalo || WGP Kickboxing 28||  Brazil || KO (Right Cross)|| 1|| 1:40
|-  bgcolor= "#FFBBBB"
| 2015-07-25 || Loss||align=left| Alex Pereira || WGP Kickboxing 25 || São Paulo, Brazil || Decision (Unanimous) || 5 || 3:00
|-
! style=background:white colspan=9 |

|-  bgcolor="#CCFFCC"
| 2014-11-29 || Win ||align=left| Aleksandr Dmitrenko || WGP Kickboxing 23 || São Paulo,Brazil || Decision|| 3 || 3:00
|-  bgcolor="#CCFFCC"
| 2014-09-27 || Win ||align=left| Francisco Araujo || WGP Kickboxing 22 || São Paulo, Brazil || KO (Right Low Kick)|| 2 || 2:50
|-
! style=background:white colspan=9 |
|-  bgcolor="#CCFFCC"
| 2013-12-21 || Win ||align=left| Alex Pereira || WGP Kickboxing 17, Final || São Paulo, Brazil || Decision || 3 || 3:00
|-
! style=background:white colspan=9 |
|-  bgcolor="#CCFFCC"
| 2013-12-21 || Win ||align=left| Cristian Torres || WGP Kickboxing 17, Semi Final || São Paulo, Brazil || KO (Left Body Kick)|| 2 || 2:40
|-  bgcolor="#CCFFCC"
| 2013-07-27 || Win ||align=left| Ricardo Soneca || WGP Kickboxing 14 || São Paulo, Brazil || Decision || 3 || 3:00
|-
|-  bgcolor="#FFBBBB"
| 2013-03-23 || Loss||align=left| Alex Pereira || SUPERKOMBAT New Heroes 2 || São Caetano, Brazil || Decision (unanimous) || 3  ||
|-
|-  bgcolor="#CCFFCC"
| 2013-01-25 || Win ||align=left| Rony Silva || Jungle Fight 48 || São Paulo, Brazil || Decision (Unanimous) || 5 || 3:00
|-  bgcolor="#CCFFCC"
| 2012-11-10 || Win ||align=left| Alessandro Benacci || WGP Kickboxing x It's Showtime 60 || São Paulo, Brazil || KO (Low Kick)|| 3 ||
|-  bgcolor="#FFBBBB"
| 2012-08-25 || Loss||align=left| Fernando Nonato || WGP Kickboxing 6 || Brazil || Decision|| 3 || 3:00
|-  bgcolor="#CCFFCC"
| 2012-07-07 || Win ||align=left| Paulo Goes || WGP Kickboxing || São Paulo, Brazil || TKO (Doctor Stoppage)|| 1 || 0:34
|-  bgcolor="#CCFFCC"
| 2012-04-07 || Win ||align=left| Marcos Caçador || WGP Kickboxing 5 || Brazil || Decision|| 3 || 3:00
|-  bgcolor="#CCFFCC"
| 2009-11-21 || Win ||align=left| Marcelo Lisboa || SP1. PRO MAX. 2 || Brazil || Decision|| 3 || 3:00
|-
| colspan=9 | Legend:

Mixed martial arts record

|-
|Win
|align=center|3–0
|Danilo Souza	
|KO (Punch)
|Shooto Brasil 110
|
|align=center|1
|align=center|0:45
|Rio de Janeiro, Brazil
| 
|-
|Win
|align=center|2–0
|Vitor Costa	
|TKO (punches)
|Road to Future 1
|
|align=center|1
|align=center|4:51
|Sao Paulo, Brazil
| 
|-
|Win
|align=center|1–0
|Thiago Araujo	
|TKO (punches)
|Shooto Brazil 61
|
|align=center|1
|align=center|1:08
|Rio de Janeiro, Brazil
|

See also
List of male kickboxers

References

External links
 Official Glory profile

1989 births
Living people
Brazilian male kickboxers
Middleweight kickboxers
Glory kickboxers
SUPERKOMBAT kickboxers
People from São Paulo
Sportspeople from São Paulo
Brazilian male mixed martial artists